In computing, Jackson is a high-performance JSON processor for Java.  Its developers extol the combination of fast, correct, lightweight, and ergonomic attributes of the library.

Implementation
Jackson provides multiple approaches to working with JSON, including using binding annotations on POJO classes for simple use cases.

Usage example
Sample code for reading and writing with POJOs may look like the following:

public class ReadWriteJackson {
  public static void main(String[] args) throws IOException {
    ObjectMapper mapper = new ObjectMapper();
   
    String jsonInput = "{\"id\":0,\"firstName\":\"Robin\",\"lastName\":\"Wilson\"}";
    Person q = mapper.readValue(jsonInput, Person.class);
    System.out.println("Read and parsed Person from JSON: " + q);
   
    Person p = new Person("Roger", "Rabbit");
    System.out.print("Person object " + p + " as JSON = ");
    mapper.writeValue(System.out, p);
  }
}

References

External links
 

Java platform
POI
JSON
Cross-platform free software